Somewhere in Time is a 1980 American romantic fantasy drama film from Universal Pictures, directed by Jeannot Szwarc, and starring Christopher Reeve, Jane Seymour, and Christopher Plummer. It is a film adaptation of the 1975 novel Bid Time Return by Richard Matheson, who also wrote the screenplay.

Reeve plays Richard Collier, a playwright who becomes obsessed with a photograph of a young woman at the Grand Hotel on Mackinac Island, Michigan. Through self-hypnosis, he wishes himself back in time to the year 1912 to find love with actress Elise McKenna (portrayed by Seymour), but comes into conflict with Elise's manager, William Fawcett Robinson (portrayed by Plummer), who fears that romance will derail her career, and resolves to stop him.

The film is known for its musical score composed by John Barry, featuring pianist Roger Williams. The 18th variation of Sergei Rachmaninoff's Rhapsody on a Theme of Paganini is also used several times.

Plot
In 1972, college theater student Richard Collier celebrates the debut of his new play. An elderly woman Richard does not know comes up and places a pocket watch in his hand and pleads, "Come back to me". The woman returns to her home and dies in her sleep that night.

Eight years later, Richard is a successful playwright living in Chicago. While struggling with writer's block, he decides to take a break from writing and travels to a resort, the Grand Hotel. While exploring the hotel's hall of history, he becomes enthralled with a vintage photograph of Elise McKenna, a beautiful early-20th century stage actress. Upon further research, he discovers she is the same woman who gave him the pocket watch. Richard visits Laura Roberts, Elise's former housekeeper and companion. While there, he discovers a music box that plays the 18th variation of Rhapsody on a Theme of Paganini by Rachmaninoff, his favorite musical piece. Among Elise's personal effects is a book on time travel written by his old college professor, Dr. Gerard Finney. Richard becomes obsessed with traveling back to 1912 and meeting Elise, with whom he has fallen in love.

Richard seeks out Professor Finney, who believes that he briefly time-traveled through the power of self-suggestion. Finney warns Richard that such a process would leave one very weak physically, perhaps dangerously so. Richard is determined to try. Dressed in an early 20th-century suit, he removes all modern objects from his hotel room and attempts to will himself to 1912 using tape-recorded suggestions. The attempt fails because he lacks real conviction, but after finding a hotel guest book from 1912 containing his signature, Richard realizes that he will eventually succeed.

Richard hypnotizes himself again, this time allowing his absolute faith in his eventual success to serve as the engine that transports him to 1912. Richard finds Elise walking by the lake. Upon meeting him she asks, "Is it you?" Her manager, William Fawcett Robinson, abruptly intervenes and sends Richard away. Although Elise is initially uninterested, Richard pursues her until she agrees to accompany him on a stroll the next morning. During a boat ride, Richard hums his favorite melody by Rachmaninoff, which Elise has not heard before because it has yet to be composed in 1934, but this does not break the spell of the time travel. Richard asks what Elise meant by "Is it you?" She reveals that Robinson had predicted that she would meet a man who will change her life, and that she should be afraid. Richard shows Elise the pocket watch that she will give him in 1972.

Richard attends Elise's play where she recites an impromptu romantic monologue while making eye contact with him in the audience. During the intermission, Elise poses formally for a photograph, but upon seeing Richard, breaks into a radiant smile. It is the same image which Richard sees 68 years later. Afterward, Richard receives an urgent message from Robinson requesting a meeting. Robinson wants Richard to leave Elise, saying it is for her own good. Richard thinks Robinson is in love with Elise, but Robinson states he is obsessed with her being a star and has no romantic interest in her. When Richard declares his intention to stand by Elise for the rest of her life, Robinson has him bound and locked inside the stables. Robinson then tells Elise that Richard has left, though she does not believe him and professes her love for Richard.

Richard wakes the next morning and frees himself. The acting troupe has already left for Denver, though Elise has returned to the hotel to find him. They go to her room and make love. They agree to marry and Elise promises to buy Richard a new suit, as his is about a decade out of style. Inside one of the suit pockets, Richard discovers a penny with a 1979 mint date. This modern item breaks the hypnotic suggestion, pulling Richard into the present as Elise screams in terror.

Richard awakens back in 1980, physically weakened by the time travel. His attempts to return to 1912 are unsuccessful. After despondently wandering the hotel grounds for weeks without eating, he dies in despair, despite Arthur’s efforts to call paramedics to save him. Richard’s spirit then joins Elise in the afterlife.

Cast
 Christopher Reeve as Richard Collier
 Jane Seymour as Elise McKenna
 Susan French as Older Elise
 Christopher Plummer as William Fawcett Robinson
 Teresa Wright as Laura Roberts
 Bill Erwin as Arthur Biehl
 Sean Hayden as 5-year-old Arthur in 1912
 George Voskovec as Dr. Gerard Finney
 John Alvin as Arthur’s father
 Eddra Gale as Genevieve
 Tim Kazurinsky as a photographer in 1912
 William H. Macy as a critic in the 1972 scene (before Elise hands the watch to Richard)
 Don Franklin as tourist in Hall of History #2

Richard Matheson, who wrote the original novel and screenplay, appears in a cameo role as a 1912 hotel guest. He is astonished by Richard's having cut himself shaving with a straight razor. Richard Matheson's daughter, Ali, is similarly credited as a student.

George Wendt is credited as a student during this same scene, but his appearance was cut from the film during editing.

Reception
Although the film was well received during its previews, it was derided by critics upon release and underperformed at the box office.  

In a TCM interview, Jane Seymour stated “Well, this what happened is we finished the movie and we weren't allowed to publicize it. The Screen Actors Guild had a strike,  and Chris and i were not allowed to tell anyone about the movie and it's about to come out plus, Universal spent, was it two million or three something, very minimal on this movie.  And they had a thing called the Blues Brothers.  They were very worried about getting their investment back on so they ignored us completely. So they hid this movie, literally hid it, and I remember we got the worst reviews ever.”

Critical response
Film review aggregator Rotten Tomatoes reports that 52% of 21 film critics have given the film a positive review; the rating average is 5.9 out of 10. Metacritic, which assigns a weighted average score out of 100 to reviews from mainstream critics, gives the film a score of 29 based on 7 reviews, signifying "Generally unfavorable reviews".

Accolades
Somewhere in Time received several awards, including Saturn Awards for Best Costume, Best Music, and Best Fantasy Film. The film was also nominated for the Academy Award for Best Costume Design (Jean-Pierre Dorleac).

The film is recognized by the American Film Institute in these lists:
 2002: AFI's 100 Years...100 Passions – Nominated
 2005: AFI's 100 Years of Film Scores – Nominated

Soundtrack
The film's original musical score was composed and conducted by John Barry, who was suggested by Jane Seymour, a personal friend. The producers had been considering a score based on the 18th variation of Sergei Rachmaninoff's "Rhapsody on a Theme of Paganini," which is used in the film several times. In lieu of a fee, Barry took a percentage of the royalties on the soundtrack, which went on to become his best-selling film score.

The film was not a success at the box office and a very limited run above promotional copies of the album was pressed with very limited circulation. Universal Pictures used "Somewhere in Time" as a test bed for soundtrack sales and did not expect it to do well at all. It was cable television the following spring where the film garnered a huge fan audience and interest in the music was tremendous. So many requests were made at record stores across the country that Universal pressed 500,000 more copies and the soundtrack, now into several pressings, still sells well on compact disc. The music became one of the most requested at weddings for a decade after the film's release. 

Barry wrote the score at a creative and prolific time in his career, scoring the music for films such as Raise the Titanic, High Road to China, and the highly acclaimed Body Heat, all within an 18-month period. Yet the score for Somewhere in Time is considered to be among the best of his career. The music from the film is often credited for much of its success by invoking a deeply emotional pull for the viewers. In the years since the film's release, the music has become as famous as the film, if not more so, with many hearing it and then seeking the film on video. 

Bruce Handy for Vanity Fair described the development of Barry’s scoring style after moving to Hollywood in 1975 as "the liquid orchestral style that would be epitomized by his music for Somewhere in Time, a 1979 time-travel romance starring Christopher Reeve and Jane Seymour."

The music has been released on two albums, neither of which are from the original sessions from the film itself. Like most soundtracks of the time, the album was a series of re-recordings with highlights of the score recorded to fit onto two sides of an LP. The original release from MCA Records has nine tracks.

 Somewhere in Time (2:58)
 The Old Woman (2:49)
 The Journey Back in Time (4:22)
 A Day Together (6:02)
 Rhapsody on a Theme of Paganini (composed by Rachmaninov) (2:57)
 Is He the One? (3:10)
 The Man of My Dreams (1:35)
 Return to the Present (4:04)
 Theme from "Somewhere in Time" (3:20)

A later release of the score was released on the Varèse Sarabande label. It was recorded in 1998 by the Royal Scottish Orchestra conducted by John Debney.

 Somewhere in Time (3:37)
 Old Woman (1:00)
 Grand Hotel (1:22)
 1912 (1:42)
 Thanks (1:20)
 June 27 (1:32)
 Room 417 (1:04)
 The Attic (4:07)
 Near the Lake (2:14)
 Rhapsody on a Theme of Paganini (composed by Rachmaninov) (3:06)
 Is He the One? (0:56)
 A Day Together (2:31)
 Rowing (1:29)
 The Man of My Dreams (1:22)
 Razor (1:12)
 Total Dismay (4:07)
 Coin (0:28)
 Whimper (3:20)
 Somewhere in Time (end credits) (4:55)

On July 13, 2021, a limited edition album was released by La-La Land Records with an expanded presentation of Barry's music. Tracks 1-17 are presentation of the score, followed by source music and alternates.

 Theme from Somewhere in Time - Performed by Roger Williams; Produced by Michael Lloyd 3:26
 The Grand Hotel 2:04
 Rhapsody on a Theme of Paganini (Piano Solo by Chet Swiatkowski) 2:54
 The Old Woman (Film Version) 2:49
 June 27 2:03
 Room 417  1:11
 The Journey Back in Time 4:29
 Is He the One? (Film Version) 3:13
 A Day Together (Film Version) 2:31
 Rowing 1:15
 The Man of My Dreams 1:42
 That's It  :40
 Razor  1:05
 Total Dismay 3:21
 Coin :37
 Return to the Present 4:10
 A Day Together (End Credits) 6:08
 After Party  2:03
 Car Jazz 2:00
 Rhapsody on a Theme of Paganini (Alternate) - Piano Solo by Chet Swiatkowski  3:03
 Rhapsody on a Theme of Paganini (Music Box) 2:11
 Is He the One? (Alternate Excerpt) 2:21
 My Melancholy Baby 2:02
 Oh, You Beautiful Doll  3:30
 In the Good Old Summer Time :37
 I Want a Girl (Just Like the Girl That Married Dear Old Dad) 1:53
 Wisdom of the Heart 1:09
 Somewhere in Time (Piano Theme) 1:59
 Rowing (Alternate) 1:18
 Razor (Alternate) :51
 Coin (Alternate) :32
 Somewhere in Time (Theme Variation) 1:46
 Finale and End Credits (From the Motion Picture Somewhere in Time) 4:57

Tracks in bold are previously unreleased. Tracks in italics contain previously unreleased material.

Certifications

Legacy

Despite reviews calling the film "horrible" and a "superficial tear jerker", the International Network of Somewhere In Time Enthusiasts (I.N.S.I.T.E.), an official fan club, was formed in 1990 and continues to meet regularly. During the month of October, the Grand Hotel hosts a Somewhere in Time Weekend, with events such as a large-screen screening of the film, panel discussions with some of the film's principals and crew, and a costume ball of members dressed in Edwardian attire.

The film was also listed as an example of popular culture time travel in the blockbuster film Avengers: Endgame (2019).

Adding to the film's legacy is a Ken Davenport-produced theatrical adaptation of the story with assistance from Matheson on the story book. The adaptation received New York workshops and a full production at Portland Center Stage.

See also
 The Two Worlds of Jennie Logan
 List of films featuring time loops

References

External links

 
 
 
 
 
 

1980 films
1980 independent films
1980 romantic drama films
1980s English-language films
1980s fantasy drama films
1980s romantic fantasy films
American fantasy drama films
American independent films
American romantic drama films
American romantic fantasy films
Films about time travel
Films directed by Jeannot Szwarc
Films based on American novels
Films based on romance novels
Films based on science fiction novels
Films based on works by Richard Matheson
Films scored by John Barry (composer)
Films set in 1912
Films set in 1972
Films set in 1980
Films set in Chicago
Films set in hotels
Films set in Michigan
Films shot in Chicago
Films shot in Michigan
Films with screenplays by Richard Matheson
Mackinac Island
Universal Pictures films
1980s American films